The 2014 NWT/Yukon Scotties Tournament of Hearts, Canada's territorial women's curling championship, was held from January 3 to 5 at the Yellowknife Curling Club in Yellowknife, Northwest Territories. The winning Sarah Koltun team represented the territories at the 2014 Scotties Tournament of Hearts in Montreal.

The event marked the first time since 2011 that teams from the Yukon participated. Both the 2012 and 2013 events were cancelled, due to the only entries coming from the Northwest Territories, making that territory's championship the qualifier for the Scotties.

The Sarah Koltun rink from Whitehorse won the event, becoming the first team from the Yukon to win the tournament since 2000. It also marks only the second time in the last 10 years that Kerry Galusha did not win the event.

Qualification
Two teams entered the Yukon championship, thus both qualifying. A best-of-three series was held to determine the territorial champion. Nicole Baldwin won the series, defeating Sarah Koltun (both of Whitehorse) two games to one. Three teams entered the Northwest Territories championship, which was a double round robin. Yellowknife's Kerry Galusha (3-1) and Inuvik's Melba Mitchell (2-2) qualified, while Yellowknife's Ann McKellar-Gillis (1-3) failed to do so.

Teams

Round-robin standings

Round-robin results

Draw 1
Friday, January 3, 2:30 pm

Draw 2
Friday, January 3, 7:30 pm

Draw 3
Saturday, January 4, 9:30 am

Draw 4
Saturday, January 4, 2:30 pm

Draw 5
Sunday, January 5, 10:00 am

Draw 6
Sunday, January 5, 3:00 pm

Tiebreaker
Monday, January 6, 9:30 am

References

External links
2014 NWT/Yukon Ladies Championships
 

Curling in the Northwest Territories
NWT/Yukon
Sport in Yellowknife
NWT/Yukon Scotties Tournament of Hearts
NWT/Yukon Scotties Tournament of Hearts